Hymenophyllum helicoideum is a species of fern in the family Hymenophyllaceae. It is endemic to Ecuador.  Its natural habitat is subtropical or tropical moist lowland forests. It is threatened by habitat loss.

References

helicoideum
Ferns of Ecuador
Endemic flora of Ecuador
Ferns of the Americas
Critically endangered flora of South America
Taxonomy articles created by Polbot
Plants described in 1892